Moana is a small town in the West Coast Region of the South Island of New Zealand. It is situated on the northern shore of Lake Brunner, and is beside the outflow of the lake into the Arnold River. There is a pedestrian suspension bridge crossing the Arnold from the town to access the lake shore across the river, with some short easy bush walks on each side. 

The town has a permanent population of less than 100, but is a popular location for summer tourism. There are around 300 holiday homes and a camping ground.

The town's main tourist attractions are the panoramic views and water sport opportunities arising from its position on the shores of Lake Brunner. The Midland Line railway passes through Moana; the TranzAlpine tourist passenger train passes through once in each direction daily, and freight trains of coal operate more frequently.

In May 2013, Moana became one of the first places in New Zealand to get 4G wireless broadband.

Demographics

The population of Moana was 57 in the 2018 census, a decrease of 9 from 2013. There were 33 males and 27 females. 89.5% of people identified as European/Pākehā, 10.5% as Māori and 5.3% as Pacific peoples. No one was under 15 years old, 10.5% were 15–29, 57.9% were 30–64, and 31.6% were 65 or older.

The statistical area of Lake Brunner, which at 1,301 square kilometres is much larger than Moana, had a population of 1,065 at the 2018 New Zealand census, an increase of 147 people (16.0%) since the 2013 census, and an increase of 312 people (41.4%) since the 2006 census. There were 186 households. There were 531 males and 534 females, giving a sex ratio of 0.99 males per female. The median age was 20.4 years (compared with 37.4 years nationally), with 444 people (41.7%) aged under 15 years, 213 (20.0%) aged 15 to 29, 330 (31.0%) aged 30 to 64, and 75 (7.0%) aged 65 or older.

Ethnicities were 95.8% European/Pākehā, 4.5% Māori, 0.8% Pacific peoples, 1.7% Asian, and 1.7% other ethnicities (totals add to more than 100% since people could identify with multiple ethnicities).

The proportion of people born overseas was 7.0%, compared with 27.1% nationally.

Although some people objected to giving their religion, 26.8% had no religion, 68.2% were Christian and 0.3% had other religions.

Of those at least 15 years old, 78 (12.6%) people had a bachelor or higher degree, and 90 (14.5%) people had no formal qualifications. The median income was $25,900, compared with $31,800 nationally. The employment status of those at least 15 was that 357 (57.5%) people were employed full-time, 87 (14.0%) were part-time, and 6 (1.0%) were unemployed.

Education
Lake Brunner School is a coeducational full primary (years 1-8) school with a roll of  students as of  Rotomanu School closed and merged into this school in 2005.

Railway station

The line was to be built and operated by private enterprise. In November 1892, the company opened the railway from Brunnerton, but at that stage Moana was only a flag station. By March 1894, the railway had reached Jacksons. However, in 1895 the company collapsed. In May 1895 the Government seized the company's assets on the grounds that the contract had expired with the works incomplete. The Government eventually completed the works under the Railways Construction and Land Act 1881.

The opening of the railway to Moana enabled settlement by Pākeha and establishment of timber mills in the local area. By June 1895 a  siding was being operated at Moana station by the Lake Brunner Sawmill Company.

On 16 April 1926, the station building was destroyed in a fire. A replacement building was constructed in the same year.  The replacement was to the standard type A design, from the family of standard railway station designs prepared by Railways architect George Troup.

The Moana Railway Station is listed as a Category 1 Historic Place by Heritage New Zealand. It is the only type A station building still remaining that is complete with its associated sidings and goods sheds.  Heritage New Zealand has also given a Category 1 listing to the Moana Railway Station Historic Area comprising the station building, a footbridge, the goods shed and the former station master’s house (now used as a cafe).

See also
 Bell Hill mill tramway

References

External links

Grey District Council page
Local website
 Moana Railway Station at Rail Heritage Trust

Grey District
Populated places in the West Coast, New Zealand
Populated lakeshore places in New Zealand